The Archdiocese of Bologna is a Latin Church ecclesiastical territory or archdiocese of the Catholic Church in Northern Italy. The cathedra is in the cathedral church of San Pietro, Bologna. The current archbishop is Cardinal Matteo Zuppi, who was installed in 2015.

The Archdiocese of Bologna is a metropolitan archdiocese and has three suffragan dioceses within its ecclesiastical province: the Diocese of Imola, the Diocese of Faenza-Modigliana, and the Archdiocese of Ferrara-Comacchio.

History

A detailed list of the various governments that have ruled Bologna is provided by Giovanni Battista Guidicini. In 1527, the Holy See became the absolute ruler of Bologna, and was represented by a Legatus a latere and a Vice-Legate. On 22 February 1530, Pope Clement VII crowned the Emperor Charles V as Holy Roman Emperor in Bologna, the last such event in history.

The bishopric of Bologna was founded in the 3rd century.

Originally it was a suffragan (under the supervision) of the diocese of Milan, but at the end of the 5th century became a suffragan of Ravenna. Because of the schism of the Antipope Clement III, Pope Paschal II, at the Council of Guastalla in October 1106, released Bologna from obedience to the church of Ravenna, and made it directly dependent on the papal See; but on 7 August 1118 Pope Gelasius II restored the previous status. Bishop Victor, therefore, enjoyed the privilege of being consecrated a bishop by Pope Paschal II in 1108. But when he came to die in 1129, the Bolognese resisted the demands of Archbishop Gualterius of Ravenna that he should consecrate the newly elected Bishop Henricus. The papal Legate, Gerardus of S. Croce in Gerusalemme, heard the dispute in his court on 13 April 1130, and Archbishop Gualterius established his right to consecrate the bishops of Bologna.

In 973, Bishop Albertus participated in a provincial synod of the ecclesiastical province of Ravenna, presided over by Archbishop Honestus, and held in the village of Marzalia in the diocese of Parma. Bishop Albertus complained to the assembly that his diocese was so poor that he was not able to sustain his clergy or his churches, on top of which Bishop Ubertus of Parma had taken control of certain territories near Parma which were the property of the diocese of Bologna. Ubertus replied that he had received them from his predecessors. The Archbishop and bishops agreed with the Bishop of Parma, chastised Albertus for raising the subject in the synod, and ordering both parties not to raise the matter again.

A major earthquake struck Bologna on Christmas Day, 1222, causing the vaults of the cathedral ceiling to collapse. Another severe earthquake occurred on 21 April 1223, centered at Cremona; and a third centered in Bologna in 1229.

In the winter of 1410, Pope Alexander V and the Papal Court arrived in Bologna, on their way from Pistoria (where plague had been detected) toward Rome, which had fallen to papal forces on 1 January 1410. Alexander died, however, while he was still in Bologna, on 4 May, waiting for the pacification of Rome and its neighborhood. A Conclave, therefore, took place in Bologna, beginning on 14 May and concluding on 17 May with the election of Cardinal Baldassare Cossa, the Legate of Bologna, who took the name John XXIII.

Pope Leo X visited Bologna from 8 December 1515 through 18 February 1516, where he held negotiations with King Francis I of France. Their talks resulted in the abrogation of the French Pragmatic Sanction and the conclusion of a new Concordat between the Papacy and France.

In 1568, as one of his efforts to implement the decrees of the Council of Trent, Bishop Gabriele Paleotti established the diocesan seminary of Bologna.

Archdiocese and metropolitan
In 1582 the diocese of Bologna was raised to the status of a metropolitan archbishopric by Pope Gregory XIII in the bull Universi orbis of 10 December 1582, which removed it from the ecclesiastical province of Ravenna. It was assigned as suffragans the diocese of Faenza and the diocese of Imola. In a decree of the Vatican Sacred Congregation of Bishops of 8 December 1976, a new arrangement of certain dioceses in ecclesiastical provinces was announced; the diocese of Ferrara was made a suffragan of the Archbishop of Bologna, though the Archbishop of Ferrara was allowed to keep the title of archbishop.

Nine of the early bishops have been recognized as saints in popular culture, and three other bishops and three archbishops have been elected to the Papacy as Pope Innocent VII (1404), Pope Nicholas V (1447), Pope Julius II (1503), Pope Gregory XV (1621), Pope Benedict XIV (1740) and Pope Benedict XV (1914).

Cathedral and Chapter

Bishop Adalfredus (after 1031 – 1055) suffered many sleepless nights, worried about the number and behavior of his Canons and their hangers-on. Finally, exasperated, he acted. On 16 August 1045, citing decrees of the holy Fathers that in each Church clerics should be ordained in accordance with the ability of that church to support those clerics ministering at the altar, he issued a decree in which he limited the number of Canons in the Cathedral of Bologna to fifty. Specifically mentioned are the Archpriest, the Cantor, and the Archdeacon. To support them, he granted them three parts of the ten percent tithe which was the episcopal income.

The Canons of the Cathedral Chapter were, according to information laid before the pope, interfering with the jurisdiction of the Archdeacon of Bologna. On 28 March 1219, Pope Honorius III wrote to the clergy and people to support the Archdeacon against the rebellion of the Canons. So that the Church of Bologna might not be despoiled of its rights if there were no person in the Chapter to have oversight of it, on 22 April 1219 Honorius granted the Archdeacons of Bologna full and free administration, spiritual and temporal, to correct and reform and decide matters. In separate letters, the Pope warned the Chapter and the Bishop not to interfere with the legitimate and canonical rights and jurisdiction of the Archdeacon.

In 1687, the Chapter of the Cathedral of S. Peter was composed of four dignities and sixteen Canons. In 1842 there were eighteen Canons. The dignities were: the Archdeacon, the Archpriest, the Provost, and the Primicerius.

Synods

A diocesan synod was an irregularly held, but important, meeting of the bishop of a diocese and his clergy. Its purpose was (1) to proclaim generally the various decrees already issued by the bishop; (2) to discuss and ratify measures on which the bishop chose to consult with his clergy; (3) to publish statutes and decrees of the diocesan synod, of the provincial synod, and of the Holy See.

In 1535, a diocesan synod was held by Bishop Agostino Zanetti, the suffragan bishop of Bologna under Cardinal Alessandro Campeggio (1526–1553),  and another in 1547. Cardinal Gabriele Paleotti (1566–1597) held a diocesan synod on 16 October 1566, another in 1580,and another in 1594.

Cardinal Alessandro Ludovisi (1612–1621) held a diocesan synod on 11 June 1620. Cardinal Ludovico Ludovisi (1621–1632) held a Congregationn of the diocese's archpriests on 9 March 1623, and then a diocesan synod on 8 June 1623. He held another on 30 May 1624. On 8 June 1634, Cardinal Girolamo Colonna (1632–1645) held a diocesan synod. Cardinal Girolamo Boncompagni (1651–1684) presided over a diocesan synod on 15 October 1654. Cardinal Giacomo Boncompagni (1690–1731) presided over a diocesan synod in Bologna on 17–19 June 1698. A diocesan synod was held in Bologna by Cardinal Andrea Giovanetti (1775–1800) on 2–4 September 1788.

Cardinal Giacomo Lercaro held a synod in 1962.

In 1586, Cardinal Paleotti held the first provincial synod of the ecclesiastical province of Bologna.

List of bishops and archbishops
An old list of the bishops of Bologna, found along with the records of the synod of 1310, and perhaps compiled around that time, exists. The following is a list of the bishops and archbishops of Bologna from 313 to the present day.

Bishops

to 1000

 Zama (313)
 Faustinianus (342)
 Domicianus (?)
 Theodorus (?)
 Jovianus
 Eusebius (370?)
 Eustasius (390?) 
 Felix (c. 397 – died 431)
 Saint Petronius (431–450)
 Marcellus
 Parthenius
 Julianus (Giuliano) 
 Hieroncius (Geronzio) 
 Theodorus
 Luxorius (?)
 Tertulliano (?)
 Iocundus (Giocondo) (496?)
 Theodorus (II) (?)
 Clemens (?)
 Petrus (I) (?)
 Germanus (?)
 Costantinus (?)
 Iulianus (II) (?)
 Deusdedit (Adeodatus) (?)
 Iustinianus (?)
 Luminosus (649)
 Donno (?)
 Vittore I (680)
 Eliseo (?)
 Gaudenzio (?)
 Causino (?)
 Barbato (736 – after 744)
 Romano (752 – after 756)
 Pietro II (786)
 Vitale (801)
 Martino I (?)
 Teodoro III (after 814 – 825)
 Cristoforo (827)
 Martino II (?)
 Pietro III (?)
 Orso (?)
 Giovanni I (880–881)
 Severo (884 – after 898)
 Pietro IV (? – died 905)
 Giovanni II (?)
 Adalbertus (by 955 – 983 or later)
 Joannes (III) (before 997 – after 1007)

1000 to 1400 

 Frogerio (after 1019 – Resigned 1028)
 Alfredo (after 1031 – 1055)
 Lamberto (after 1062 – after 1074)
 Sigifredus (1074 –1079)
 Gerardus (I) (1079–1089)
 Bernardus (1096–1104)
 Victor (II) (1108–1129)
 Enrico (I) (1130–1145)
 Gerardo Grassi (1145–1165)
 Giovanni (IV) (attested 1169 – 1187)
 Gerardo di Gisla (1187–1198)
 Gerardo Ariosti (1198 – resigned 1213)
 Enrico della Fratta (1213–1240)
 Ottaviano degli Ubaldini, Procurator (1240–1244)
 Giacomo Boncambi, O.P. (1244–1260)
 Ottaviano II degli Ubaldini (1261–1295)
 Schiatta degli Ubaldini (1295 – died 1298)
 Giovanni Savelli, O.P. (1299 – died 1301)
 Uberto Avvocati (19 September 1301 – June 1322)
 Arnaldo Sabatier di Cahors (1322 –1330)
 Stefano Ugonet (1331–1332)
 Bertrando Tessendari (5 June 1332 – 1339)
 Beltramino Parravicini (5 September 1340 – died 1350)
 Giovanni di Naso, O.P. (13 October 1350 – died 3 August 1361)
 Almerico Cathy (18 August 1361 – 1371)
 Bernardo de Bonnevalle (18 July 1371 – deposed 1378)
 Filippo Carafa (apostolic administrator: 28 September 1378 – died 1389)
 Cosimo de' Migliorati (19 June 1389 – resigned 1390)
 Rolando da Imola, O.P. (1390)
 Bartolomeo Raimondi, O.S.B. (21 August 1392 – died 16 June 1406)

after 1400
 Antonio Correr, C.R.S.G.A. (31 March 1407 – resigned 2 November 1412)
 Giovanni di Michele, O.S.B. (1412 – died 5 January 1417)
 Niccolò Albergati, O.Cart. (4 January 1417 – died 9 May 1443)
 Cardinal Ludovico Trevisano (apostolic administrator: 9 May 1443 – resigned 1444)
 Nicolò Zanolini, C.R.L. (bishop-elect 1444)
 Tomaso Parentucelli (1444–1447)
 Giovanni del Poggio (Jean de Podio) (22 March 1447 – died 15 December 1447)
 Filippo Calandrini (1447–1476)
 Francesco Gonzaga, Administrator (26 July 1476 – died 21 October 1483)
 Cardinal Giuliano della Rovere (1483–1502) 
 Giovanni Stefano Ferrero (1502–1510)
 Cardinal Francesco Alidosi, Administrator (18 October 1510 – 24 May 1511)
 Cardinal Achille Grassi (24 May 1511 – 22 November 1523)
 Cardinal Lorenzo Campeggio (1523–1525)
 Cardinal Andrea della Valle, Administrator (20 December 1525 – 19 March 1526)
 Cardinal Alessandro Campeggio (1526–1553)

 Giovanni Campeggio (1553–1563)
 Cardinal Rannucio Farnese, Administrator (17 July 1564 – 28 October 1565)

Archbishops
 Cardinal Gabriele Paleotti (1566–1597)
 Alfonso Paleotti (1597–1610) 
 Cardinal Scipione Caffarelli-Borghese (1610–1612)
 Cardinal Alessandro Ludovisi (1612–1621)
 Cardinal Ludovico Ludovisi (29 March 1621 – 18 November 1632)
 Cardinal Girolamo Colonna (24 November 1632 – 1645) 
 Cardinal Niccolò Albergati-Ludovisi (1645–1651)
 Cardinal Girolamo Boncompagni (11 December 1651 – 24 January 1684)

 Sede vacante (1684–1688)
 Cardinal Angelo Ranuzzi (1688–1689) 
 Cardinal Giacomo Boncompagni (1690–1731)
 Cardinal Prospero Lorenzo Lambertini (30 April 1731 – 17 August 1740)
 Cardinal Vincenzo Malvezzi (14 January 1754 – 3 December 1775)
 Cardinal Andrea Giovanetti (15 December 1775 – 8 April 1800)
 Cardinal Carlo Oppizoni (20 September 1802 – 31 May 1831) 
 Cardinal Michele Viale-Prelà (28 September 1855 – 15 May 1860)
 Cardinal Filippo Guidi, O.P. (1863–1871) 
 Cardinal Carlo Luigi Morichini (1871–1876)

 Cardinal Lucido Parocchi (12 March 1877 – 28 June 1882)
 Cardinal Francesco Battaglini (3 July 1882 – 8 July 1892) 
 Cardinal Serafino Vannutelli (16 January 1893 – 12 June 1893) 
 Cardinal Domenico Svampa (1894–1907) 
 Cardinal Giacomo della Chiesa (18 December 1907 – 3 September 1914)
 Cardinal Giorgio Gusmini (8 September 1914 – 24 August 1921)
 Cardinal Giovanni Nasalli Rocca di Corneliano (21 November 1921 – 13 March 1952) 
 Cardinal Giacomo Lercaro (19 April 1952 – 12 February 1968) 
 Cardinal Antonio Poma (12 February 1968 – 11 February 1983) 
 Enrico Manfredini (18 March 1983 – 16 December 1983) 
 Cardinal Giacomo Biffi (19 April 1984 – 16 December 2003)
 Cardinal Carlo Caffarra (16 December 2003 – 27 October 2015)
 Cardinal Matteo Zuppi (27 October 2015 – present)

Deaneries and Parishes of the Archdiocese of Bologna

Deanery of Bologna Centro

It includes the whole territory of Bologna City Centre:

Bologna Cathedral (Cattedrale Metropolitana di San Pietro)
Basilica of San Petronio
Chiesa dei 33 Anni di Nostro Signore
Santuario Parrocchiale della Beata Vergine del Soccorso
Santuario del Corpus Domini
Santuario Madonna della Pioggia
Santuario Madonna del Baraccano
Chiesa Madonna di Galliera
Parrocchia Maria Regina Mundi
Chiesa di Santa Cristina
Chiesa di Santa Maria Labarum Caeli
Chiesa di San Michele dei Leprosetti
Chiesa di San Niccolò degli Alberi
Parrocchia di San Carlo
Parrocchia di San Benedetto
Basilica of Saint Dominic (Bologna)
Basilica of Saint Francis (Bologna)
Basilica of San Giacomo Maggiore
Parrocchia di San Giovanni in Monte (Bologna) 
Parrocchia di San Giuliano
Parrocchia di San Martino
Parochial Basilica of San Paolo Maggiore
Basilica of Santa Maria dei Servi
Parrocchia di San Procolo
Parrocchia di Santa Caterina di Strada Maggiore
Parrocchia di Santa Caterina di Via Saragozza
Chiesa di Santa Croce
Parrocchia di Santa Maria della Carità 
Parrocchia di Santa Maria della Pietà 
Santuario di Santa Maria della Visitazione
Santuario di Santa Maria della Vita
Parrocchia di Santa Maria della Muratella
Parrocchia dei Santi Maria e Domenica della Mascarella
Parrocchia di Santa Maria e San Valentino alla Grada
Prioral Parish of Santa Maria Maddalena
Santuario di Santa Maria Regina dei Cieli
Basilica di Santa Maria Maddalena
Parochial Basilica dei Santi Bartolomeo e Gaetano
Parrocchia dei Santi Filippo e Giacomo 
Parrocchia dei Santi Giuseppe e Ignazio
Chiesa dei Santi Giuseppe e Teresa
Chiesa dei Santi Gregorio e Siro
Parrocchia di San Vitale e Agricola in Arena
Parrocchia della Santissima Trinità 
Santuario del Santissimo Crocifisso
Chiesa del Santissimo Salvatore
Basilica of Santo Stefano (Bologna)
Chiesa di Sant'Antonio Abate
Parrocchia di Sant'Isaia
Parrocchia di San Sigismondo

Deanery of Bologna Ravone

It includes the territories of the Reno and Saragozza boroughs:

Sanctuary of the Madonna di San Luca
Parrocchia della Beata Vergine Immacolata
Parrocchia della Santa Famiglia
Parrocchia di San Gioacchino
Chiesa di San Girolamo della Certosa
Parrocchia di San Giuseppe
Chiesa di San Giuseppe Cottolengo
Parrocchia di San Paolo di Ravone
Parrocchia di Santa Maria Assunta di Casaglia
Parrocchia di Santa Maria delle Grazie in San Pio V
Parrocchia di Santa Maria Madre della Chiesa
Parrocchia di Sant'Andrea Apostolo della Barca
Parrocchia di Sant'Eugenio

Deanery of Bologna Sud-Est

It includes the territories of the Savena and Santo Stefano boroughs and the municipality of Sasso Marconi:

Parrocchia Beata Vergine del Carmine di Monte Donato
Parrocchia del Corpus Domini
Parrocchia Madonna del Lavoro
Parrocchia di Nostra Signora della Fiducia
Parrocchia di San Gaetano
Parrocchia di San Giacomo Fuori le Mura
Parrocchia di San Lorenzo
Parrocchia di San Giovanni Bosco
Parrocchia di San Michele Arcangelo di Gaibola
Parrocchia di San Michele in Bosco
Parrocchia di San Paolo in Monte
Parrocchia di San Ruffillo
Parrocchia di San Silverio di Chiesa Nuova
Parrocchia di San Severino
Parrocchia di San Vittore
Parrocchia di Santa Maria Annunziata del Fossolo
Parrocchia di Santa Maria della Misericordia
Parrocchia di Santa Maria Goretti
Parrocchia di Santa Maria Lacrimosa degli Alemanni
Parrocchia di Santa Teresa del Bambino Gesù
Parrocchia dei Santi Francesco e Mamolo
Parrocchia della Santissima Annunziata a Porta Procula
Parrocchia di Sant'Anna
Parrocchia di Sant'Ansano Pieve del Pino
Santuario di Sant'Antonio da Padova
Parrocchia di Sant'Pollinare di Paderno

Deanery of Bologna Nord

It includes the territories of the San Vitale, Navile and San Donato boroughs, as well as the municipalities of Castel Maggiore and Granarolo dell'Emilia:

Navile Borough

Parrocchia Gesù Buon Pastore
Parrocchia Sacro Cuore di Gesù
Parrocchia di San Bartolomeo della Vegetata
Parrocchia di San Cristoforo
Parrocchia di San Girolamo dell'Arcoveggio
Parrocchia di San Giuseppe Lavoratore
Parrocchia di San Martino di Bertalla
Parrocchia dei Santi Angeli Custodi
Parrocchia dei Santi Monica e Agostino
Parrocchia dei Santi Savino e Silvestro di Corticella
Parrocchia di Sant'Antonio da Padova alla Dozza
Parrocchia di Sant'Ignazio di Antiochia

San Vitale Borough

Parrocchia di San Giacomo della Croce del Biacco
Parrocchia di Santa Maria del Suffragio
Parrocchia di Santa Rita
Parrocchia di Sant'Antonio di Savena

San Donato Borough

Parrocchia di San Domenico Savio
Parrocchia di San Donnino
Parrocchia di San Giovanni Battista di Calamonaci
Parrocchia di San Nicolò di Villola
Parrocchia di Sant'Andrea Apostolo di Quarto Superiore
Parrocchia di San Vincenzo de' Paoli
Parrocchia di Santa Caterina da Bologna
Parrocchia di Sant'Antonio Maria Pucci
Parrocchia di Sant'Egidio Abate

Municipality of Castel Maggiore

Parrocchia di San Bartolomeo di Bondanello
Parrocchia di San Giovanni Battista di Trebbo di Reno
Parrocchia di Santa Maria Assunta di Sabbiuno di Piano
Parrocchia di Sant'Andrea di Castel Maggiore

Municipality of Granarolo dell'Emilia

Parrocchia di San Mamante di Lovoleto
Parrocchia di San Michele Arcangelo di Quarto Inferiore
Parrocchia di San Vitale di Granarolo dell'Emilia
Parrocchia dei Santi Vittore e Giorgio di Viadagola
Parrocchia di Sant'Andrea di Cadriano

Deanery of Bologna Ovest

It includes the territory of the Borgo Panigale Borough, as well as the Municipalities of Casalecchio di Reno, Anzola dell'Emilia, Calderara di Reno, and Zola Predosa:

Parrocchia di Cristo Re di Le Tombe
Parrocchia di Cristo Risorto di Casalecchio
Parrocchia del Cuore Immacolato di Maria
Parrocchia di Nostra Signora della Pace
Parrocchia di San Biagio di Casalecchio di Reno 
Parrocchia di San Giovanni Evangelista di Casalecchio di Reno
Parrocchia di San Luigi di Riale
Parrocchia di San Martino di Casalecchio di Reno
Parrocchia di San Michele Arcangelo di Longara
Parrocchia di San Petronio di Osteria Nuova
Parrocchia San Pio X
Parrocchia San Tomaso di Gesso
Parrocchia di San Vitale di Reno
Parrocchia di Santa Croce di Casalecchio di Reno
Parrocchia di Santa Lucia di Casalecchio di Reno
Parrocchia di Santa Maria Assunta di Borgo Panigale
Parrocchia di Santa Maria del Carmine di Rigosa
Parrocchia di Santa Maria di Calderara di Reno
Parrocchia di Santa Maria di Gesso
Parrocchia di Santa Maria di Ponte Ronca
Parrocchia di Santa Maria in Strada
Parrocchia dei Santi Antonio e Andrea di Ceretolo
Parrocchia dei Santi Giovanni Battista e Benedetto di Rozzano all'Eremo
Parrocchia dei Santi Giovanni Battista e Gemma Galgani
Parrocchia di San Nicolò e Agata di Zola Predosa
Parrocchia di Sant'Elena di Sacerno
Parrocchia Santo Spirito
Parrocchia dei Santi Pietro e Paolo di Anzola dell'Emilia

Deanery of Persiceto - Castelfranco

This deanery includes the municipalities of San Giovanni in Persiceto, Castelfranco Emilia, and parts of Sala Bolognese, Sant'Agata Bolognese, and Crevalcore:

Parochial Sanctuary of Madonna del Poggio
Parrocchia di San Bartolomeo a Manzolino
Parrocchia di San Biagio di Bonconvento
Parrocchia di San Biagio di Zenegirolo
Parrocchia di San Camillo de Lellis di San Giovanni in Persiceto
Parrocchia di San Giacomo di Lorenzatico
Parrocchia di San Giacomo di Piumazzo
Parrocchia di San Giovanni Battista di Gaggio di Piano
Collegiate Church of San Giovanni Battista di San Giovanni in Persiceto
Parrocchia di San Giuseppe di Caselle di Crevalcore
Parrocchia di San Matteo della Decima
Parrocchia di San Matteo di Ronchi di Crevalcore
Parrocchia di San Maurizio di Recovato
Parrocchia di San Michele Arcangelo di Bagno di Piano
Parrocchia di San Pietro di Riolo
Parrocchia di San Silvestro Papa di Crevalcore
Parrocchia di Santa Clelia Barbieri di Cavazzona
Pieve di Santa Maria Annunziata e San Biagio di Sala Bolognese
Parrocchia di Santa Maria Assunta di Castelfranco Emilia
Parrocchia di Santa Maria Assunta di Padulle
Parrocchia di Santa Maria della Neve di Rastellino
Parochial Sanctuary of Santa Maria delle Budrie
Parrocchia di Santa Maria e Danio di Amola
Parrocchia dei Santi Andrea e Agata di Sant'Agata Bolognese
Parrocchia dei Santi Filippo e Giacomo di Panzano
Parrocchia dei Santi Francesco e Carlo di Sammartini
Parrocchia dei Santi Ippolito e Cassiano
Parrocchia dei Santi Senesio e Teopompo di Tivoli

Deanery of Cento

It includes the communes of Cento, Pieve di Cento, Castello d'Argile, and Terre del Reno:

Santuario della Madonna della Rocca
Basilica of San Biagio di Cento
Parrocchia di San Giacomo di Bevilacqua
Parrocchia di San Giorgio di Corpo Reno
Parrocchia di San Giovanni Battista di Dosso
Parrocchia di San Giovanni Battista di Palata Pepoli
Parrocchia di San Lorenzo di Casumaro
Parrocchia di San Martino di Buonacompra
Parrocchia di San Paolo di Mirabello
Parrocchia di San Pietro Apostolo di Castello d'Argile
Parrocchia di San Pietro di Cento
Parrocchia di San Sebastiano di Renazzo
Parrocchia di Santa Maria del Calice di Alberone
Parrocchia di Santa Maria di Galeazza Pepoli
Parrocchia di Santa Maria di Venezzano
Parrocchia di Santa Maria e Sant'Isidoro di Penzale
Parrocchia di Santa Maria Maggiore di Pieve di Cento
Parrocchia dei Santi Carlo e Benedetto
Parrocchia di Sant'Agostino
Parrocchia di Sant'Anna di Reno Centese

Deanery of Galliera

It includes the territories of Galliera, Baricella, Malalbergo, San Pietro in Casale, San Giorgio di Piano, Bentivoglio, Poggio Renatico, and Minerbio:

Parrocchia di Maria Santissima Ausiliatrice di Bentivoglio
Parrocchia di San Gabriele di Baricella
Parrocchia di San Giacomo del Poggetto
Parrocchia di San Giacomo di Gavaseto
Parrocchia di San Giorgio Martire di San Giorgio di Piano
Parrocchia di San Giovanni Battista decollato di Chiesa Nuova
Parrocchia di San Giovanni Battista di Altedo
Parrocchia di San Giovanni Battista di Minerbio
Parrocchia di San Giovanni Battista di San Giovanni in Triario
Parrocchia di San Marino
Parrocchia di San Martino di Castagnolo Minore
Parrocchia di San Martino di Massumano
Parrocchia di San Martino di Soverzano
Parrocchia di San Michele Arcangelo di Argelato
Parrocchia di San Michele Arcangelo di Cenacchio
Parrocchia di San Michele Arcangelo di Poggio Renatico
Parrocchia di San Venanzio di Galliera
Parrocchia di San Venanzio di Stiatico
Parrocchia di Santa Caterina di Gallo
Parrocchia di Santa Filomena di Passo Segni
Parrocchia di Santa Margherita di Armarolo
Parrocchia di Santa Maria di Baricella
Parrocchia di Santa Maria di Galliera
Parrocchia di Santa Maria e San Folco di Saletto
Parrocchia di Santa Maria Lauretana di Boschi di Baricella
Parrocchia dei Santi Cosma e Damiano di Pegola
Parrocchia dei Santi Filippo e Giacomo di Casadio
Parrocchia dei Santi Filippo e Giacomo di Ca' de Fabbri
Parrocchia dei Santi Geminiano e Benedetto di Gherghenzano
Parrocchia dei Santi Niccolo e Petronio di Funo
Parrocchia dei Santi Pietro e Paolo di San Pietro in Casale
Parrocchia dei Santi Simone e Giuda di Rubizzano
Parrocchia dei Santi Vincenzo e Anastasio di Galliera
Parrocchia dei Santi Vittore e Martino di Cinquanta
Parrocchia di Sant'Alberto di San Pietro in Casale
Parrocchia di Sant'Andrea di Maccaretolo
Parrocchia di Sant'Andrea di Santa Maria in Duno
Parrocchia di Sant'Antonio Abate di Malalbergo

Deanery of Budrio

It includes the territory of Budrio, Medicina, and Molinella:

Parrocchia di San Barnaba di Fantuzza
Parrocchia di San Gregorio Magno di Dugliolo
Parrocchia di San Lorenzo Martire di Budrio
Parrocchia di San Lorenzo Martire di Prunaro
Parrocchia di San Mamante di Medicina
Parrocchia di San Marco di Vigorso
Parrocchia di San Martino di Medesano
Parrocchia di San Martino in Argine
Parrocchia di San Matteo di Molinella
Parrocchia di San Michele Arcangelo di Ganzanigo
Parrocchia di San Michele Arcangelo di Mezzolara
Parrocchia di San Pietro Capofiume
Parrocchia di Santa Croce di Marmorta
Parrocchia di Santa Croce di Selva Malvezzi
Parrocchia di Santa Croce e San Michele di Portonovo
Parrocchia di Santa Maria Annunziata di Buda
Parrocchia di Santa Maria Annunziata di Vedana
Parrocchia di Santa Maria in Garda di Villa Fontana
Parrocchia di Santa Maria e San Biagio di Cento
Parrocchia di Santa Maria Maddalena di Cazzano
Parrocchia dei Santi Filippo e Giacomo di Ronchi
Parrocchia dei Santi Gervasio e Protasio di Pieve di Budrio
Parrocchia dei Santi Giacomo e Biagio di Bagnarola
Parrocchia dei Santi Giovanni Battista e Donnino di Villa Fontana
Parrocchia della Santissima Trinita di Fiorentina
Parrocchia di Sant'Antonio Abate di Quaderna

Deanery of Castel San Pietro Terme

It includes the territories of Castel San Pietro Terme, Castel Guelfo, and parts of Casalfiumanese, whose territory is mostly part of the Diocese of Imola:

Parochial Sanctuary of Madonna del Lato
Sanctuary of the Madonna del Poggio
Parrocchia del Sacro Cuore di Gesu e San Giovanni Battista di Castel Guelfo
Parrocchia di Santa Croce di Crocetta Hercolani
Parrocchia di San Bartolomeo di Frassineto
Parrocchia di San Biagio di Poggio
Parrocchia di San Giorgio di Varignana
Parrocchia di San Mamante di Liano
Parrocchia di San Martino in Pedriolo
Parrocchia di San Michele Arcangelo di Casalecchio dei Conti
Chiesa di Santa Giuliana
Parrocchia di Santi Maria e Lorenzo di Varignana
Parrocchia di Santa Maria Maggiore di Castel San Pietro Terme
Parrocchia dei Santi Clemente e Cassano di Rignano
Parrocchia dei Santi Re Magi di Gallo Bolognese
Parrocchia di Sant'Antonio della Gaiana

Deanery of San Lazzaro-Castenaso

This deanery includes the territories of San Lazzaro di Savena, Castenaso, Pianoro, Ozzano dell'Emilia and parts of Monterenzio:

Parrocchia Cristo Re di Monterenzio
Santuario Madonna del Pilar
Parrocchia di San Bartolomeo di Musiano
Parrocchia di San Benedetto del Querceto
Parrocchia di San Biagio di Castel de' Britti
Parrocchia di San Cristoforo di Ozzano dell'Emilia
Parrocchia di San Francesco d'Assisi di San Lazzaro di Savena
Parrocchia di San Geminiano di Marano
Parrocchia di San Giacomo di Pianoro
Parrocchia di San Giovanni Battista di Castenaso
Parrocchia di San Giovanni Battista di Colunga
Parrocchia di San Giovanni Battista di Livergnano
Parrocchia di San Giovanni Battista di Mercatale
Parrocchia di San Giovanni Battista di Monte Calvo
Parrocchia di San Lazzaro in San Lazzaro di Savena
Parrocchia di San Lorenzo del Farneto
Parrocchia di San Luca Evangelista di Cicogna
Parrocchia di San Pietro di Fiesso
Parrocchia di San Pietro di Ozzano dell'Emilia
Parrocchia di San Salvatore di Casola
Parrocchia di Santa Cecilia della Croara
Parrocchia di Santa Maria Assunta di Caselle
Parrocchia di Santa Maria Assunta di Pianoro
Parrocchia di Santa Maria Assunta e di San Gabriele dell'Addolorata di Idice
Parrocchia di Santa Maria del Suffragio di Pizzano
Parrocchia di Santa Maria della Quaderna
Parrocchia di Santa Maria di Zena
Parrocchia di Santa Maria e San Giuseppe di Cassano
Parrocchia dei Santi Michele e Arcangelo di Sassuno
Parrocchia dei Santi Pietro e Girolamo di Rastignano
Parrocchia di Sant'Agostino della Ponticella
Parrocchia di Sant'Alessandro di Bisano
Parrocchia di Sant'Ambrogio di Villanova
Parrocchia di Sant'Andrea di Sesto
Parrocchia di Sant'Emiliano di Russo

Deanery of -Savena-

It includes the territories of Loiano, Monghidoro, Monterenzio, Marzabotto, Castiglione dei Pepoli, Rioveggio, and San Benedetto Val di Sambro:

Parrocchia della Beata Vergine del Rosario e San Lorenzo di Piamaggio
Sanctuary of Boccadirio
Parrocchia Cuore Immacolato di Maria di Rioveggio
Parochial Sanctuary of Madonna dei Fornelli
Parrocchia di San Benedetto Abate di San Benedetto Val di Sambro
Parrocchia di San Biagio di Castel dell'Alpi
Parrocchia di San Cristoforo di Mongardino
Parrocchia di San Cristoforo di Vedegheto
Parrocchia di San Giacomo delle Calvane
Parrocchia di San Giacomo di Creda
Parrocchia di San Giacomo di Gabbiano
Parrocchia di San Giorgio di Montefredente
Parrocchia di San Giovanni Battista di Piano del Voglio
Parrocchia di San Giovanni Battista di Scanello
Parrocchia di San Giovanni Battista di Trasserra
Parrocchia di San Giovanni Battista di Vado
Parrocchia di San Giovanni Evangelista di Monzuno
Parrocchia di San Giuseppe di Pian di Venola
Parrocchia di San Gregorio di Qualto
Parrocchia di San Lorenzo di Castiglione dei Pepoli
Parrocchia di San Lorenzo di Panico
Parrocchia di San Lorenzo di Roncastaldo
Parrocchia di San Lorenzo di Sasso Marconi
Parrocchia di San Martino di Battedizzo
Parrocchia di San Martino di Trasasso
Parrocchia di San Michele Arcangelo di Baragazza
Parrocchia di San Michele Arcangelo di Le Mogne
Parrocchia di San Michele Arcangelo di Montasico
Parrocchia di San Michele Arcangelo di Sparvo
Parrocchia di San Niccolo delle Lagune
Parrocchia di San Niccolo di Gardeletta
Parrocchia di San Pietro di Sasso Marconi
Parrocchia di San Procolo di Fradusto
Parrocchia di San Prospero di Campeggio
Parrocchia di San Tommaso di Sperticano
Parrocchia di Santa Cristina di Ripoli
Parrocchia di Santa Giustina di Piano di Setta
Parrocchia di Santa Maria Assunta di Luminasio
Parrocchia di Santa Maria Assunta di Monghidoro
Parrocchia di Santa Maria Assunta di Sirano
Parrocchia di Santa Maria di Bibulano
Parrocchia di Santa Maria di Lagaro
Parrocchia dei Santi Donnino e Sebastiano di Borgonuovo
Parrocchia dei Santi Giacomo e Margherita di Loiano
Parrocchia dei Santi Giorgio e Leo di San Leo
Parrocchia dei Santi Giuseppe e Carlo di Marzabotto
Parrocchia dei Santi Pietro e Paolo di Barbarolo
Parrocchia di Santo Stefano di Pontecchio Marconi
Parrocchia di Santo Stefano di Scascoli
Parrocchia di Sant'Agata di Monteacuto Vallese
Parrocchia di Sant'Andrea di San Benedetto Val di Sambro
Parrocchia di Sant'Ansano di Brento

Deanery of Vergato

It includes the territories of Vergato, Castel d'Aiano, and Grizzana Morandi:

Sanctuary of Beata Vergine della Consolazione di Montovolo
Parrocchia Sacro Cuore di Gesu di Vergato
Parrocchia di San Biagio di Cereglio
Parrocchia di San Donnino di Burzanello
Parrocchia di San Giacomo di Sassomolare
Parrocchia di San Giovanni Battista in Tavernola
Parrocchia di San Giovanni Battista di Veggio
Parrocchia di San Giovanni Battista di Verzuna
Parrocchia di San Lorenzo in Vimignano
Parrocchia di San Martino di Prada in Carbona
Parrocchia di San Martino di Rocca di Roffreno
Parrocchia di San Michele Arcangelo di Grizzana Morandi
Parrocchia di San Pietro di Pieve di Roffreno
Parrocchia di Santa Margherita di Carviano a Poggio di Carviano
Parrocchia di Santa Maria Assunta di Castel d'Aiano
Parrocchia di Santa Maria Assunta, Riola di Vergato
Parrocchia di Santa Maria Assunta di Tolè
Parrocchia di Santa Maria Assunta di Villa d'Aiano
Parrocchia di Santa Maria e Santo Stefano di Labante
Parrocchia di San Michele Arcangelo e San Pietro di Salvaro
Parrocchia Santissimo Salvatore di Rodiano
Parrocchia di Sant'Andrea di Savignano
Parrocchia di Sant'Antonio da Padova in Pioppe
Parrocchia di Sant'Apollinare di Calvenzano

Deanery of Porretta Terme

It includes the territories of Alto Reno Terme, Camugnano, Castel di Casio, Gaggio Montano, and Lizzano in Belvedere:

Parrocchia Beata Vergine di San Luca di Querciola
Parrocchia Cuore Immacolato di Molino del Pallone
Chiesa dell'Immacolata Concezione
Sanctuary of Madonna dell'Acero
Parrocchia di Nostra Signora del Sacro Cuore di Gesu di Marano
Parrocchia di San Bartolomeo di Silla
Parrocchia di San Biagio di Castel di Casio
Parrocchia di San Giacomo di Bargi
Parrocchia di San Giacomo di Bombiana
Parrocchia di San Lorenzo di Lustrola
Parrocchia di San Mamante di Lizzano in Belvedere
Parrocchia di San Martino di Camugnano
Parrocchia di San Michele Arcangelo di Rocca Pitignana
Parrocchia di San Niccolo di Granaglione
Parrocchia di San Pietro di Vidiciatico
Parrocchia di San Prospero di Badi
Parrocchia di Santa Lucia di Pietracolora
Parrocchia di Santa Maria Assunta di Casola dei Bagni
Parrocchia di Santa Maria Assunta di Castelluccio
Parrocchia di Santa Maria Maddalena di Porretta Terme
Parrocchia di Santa Maria Villiana
Parrocchia di San Carlo e San Bernardino di Carpineta
Parrocchia dei Santi Giovanni Battista e Pietro di Borgo Capanne
Parrocchia dei Santi Giusto e Clemente di Suviana
Parrocchia dei Santi Michele Arcangelo e Nazario di Gaggio Montano
Parrocchia di Santo Stefano di Baigno
Parrocchia di Sant'Agostino di Boschi di Granaglione

Deanery of Bazzano and Valsamoggia

This includes the territory of the former municipalities of Bazzano, Castello di Serravalle, Crespellano, Monteveglio, and Savigno, together with the municipality of Monte San Pietro:

Parrocchia della Beata Vergine del Rosario di Calderino
Parrocchia di San Biagio di Savigno
Parrocchia di San Cristoforo di Montemaggiore
Parrocchia di San Donato di Ponzano
Parrocchia di San Giorgio di Samoggia
Parrocchia di San Giovanni Battista di Monte San Giovanni
Parrocchia di San Giovanni Battista di Monte San Pietro
Parrocchia di San Lorenzo di Ronca
Parrocchia di San Lorenzo in Collina
Parrocchia di San Martino in Casola
Parrocchia di San Matteo di Savigno
Parrocchia di San Michele Arcangelo di Tiola
Parrocchia di San Nicolo di Calcara
Parrocchia di San Paolo di Oliveto
Parrocchia di San Pietro di Serravalle
Parrocchia di San Savino di Crespellano
Parrocchia di Sant'Andrea di Montebudello
Parrocchia di Sant'Apollinare di Serravalle
Parrocchia di Santa Croce di Savigno
Parrocchia di Santa Maria Assunta di Merlano
Parrocchia di Santa Maria di Fagnano
Parrocchia di Santa Maria di Monteveglio
Parrocchia di Santa Maria Nascente di Pragatto
Parrocchia dei Santi Pietro e Sigismondo di Mongiorgio
Parrocchia dei Santi Senesio e Teopompo di Zappolino
Parrocchia di Santo Stefano di Bazzano

Patrimony
In 2012 the owner of FAAC, an international automatic gate manufacturer, Michelangelo Manini died. He left his entire estate worth an estimated €1.7 billion euro to the diocese, including 66% of FAAC shares. Eventually the Archdiocese acquired the entire company. Cardinal Caffarra established a three person trust to manage the business with the diocese receiving a share of this. In 2015 in received €5 million, in 2019 it was €10 million. This money was distributed to schools and the poor, the homeless and migrants.

References

Books

Reference works for bishops
 pp. 675–677.

Studies

Kehr, Paul Fridolin (1906). Italia Pontificia Vol. V: Aemilia, sive Provincia Ravennas. Berlin: Weidmann, pp. 242–297. (in Latin).

Lanzoni, Francesco (1927). Le diocesi d'Italia dalle origini al principio del secolo VII (an. 604). Faenza: F. Lega, pp. 778–790. 
Lanzoni, Francesco (1832). ed. G. Cantagalli. Cronotassi dei vescovi di Bologna dai primordi alla fine del secolo XIII. Bologna 1932. 
Prodi, Paolo; Paolini, Lorenzo (1997)  "Cronotassi dei vescovi di Bologna", in: Storia della Chiesa di Bologna. Bergamo: Bolis 1997. pp. 384–387. 
 [original documents]
Schwartz, Gerhard (1907). Die Besetzung der Bistümer Reichsitaliens unter den sächsischen und salischen Kaisern: mit den Listen der Bischöfe, 951-1122. Leipzig: B.G. Teubner. pp. 162–165. (in German)
 [often cited, but highly unreliable]

External links
 Chiesa di Bologna 

Dioceses established in the 3rd century
Roman Catholic dioceses in Emilia-Romagna

3rd-century establishments in Italy